Dacabalaio is a village in the southcentral part of the island of Santiago, Cape Verde. It is part of the municipality of São Domingos. It is 2 km south of Rui Vaz and 4 km southwest of the municipal seat São Domingos. In 2010 its population was 47. Its elevation is about 710 m.

References

Villages and settlements in Santiago, Cape Verde
São Domingos Municipality, Cape Verde